Peltophyllum is a genus of myco-heterotrophic plants in family Triuridaceae, native to southern South America. It contains the following species:

Peltophyllum caudatum (Poulsen) R.Schmid & M.D.Turner - Rio de Janeiro
Peltophyllum luteum Gardner - Brazil, Argentina, Paraguay

References

Pandanales genera
Parasitic plants
Triuridaceae